V399 Carinae (V399 Car, P Carinae, P Car, 195 G. Carinae) is a variable star in the constellation Carina.

The spectral type of V399 Carinae has been variously assigned between A5 and F0, being a bright, luminous supergiant. Its spectrum is described as having a non-photospheric continuum and silicon absorption lines, indicative of high mass loss.

V399 Carinae has long been suspected to be variable.  A 1981 study of yellow supergiants fit observations to a Cepheid-like light curve with a period of 58.8 days, although the luminosity and spectral type do not place the star near the Cepheid instability strip.  It was listed in the General Catalogue of Variable Stars as a possible δ Cep variable.  Further observations refined the period to 47.25 days.  The Hipparcos catalogue classified V399 Car as a semiregular variable with a period of 88 days and a mean amplitude of only 0.04 magnitudes.  An automated classification from Hipparos photometry suggested it is an α Cygni variable.  The observed brightness varies from magnitude +4.63 to +4.72.

V399 Carinae lies amongst the stars of the open cluster IC 2581, by far the brightest member of the cluster.  It is about 7,500 light years from Earth assuming it is a member of IC 2581, which is given a 62.9% probability.

In 2022, TESS conducted a search for substellar companions  around Delta Scuti variables and found an object around V393 Carinae. The object has a mass of around 100 Jupiter masses and an orbital period of about 700 days.

References

Carinae, P
Carinae, V399
090772
4110
Carina (constellation)
Cepheid variables
051192
Gould objects
Semiregular variable stars
Alpha Cygni variables
Durchmusterung objects